This is a list of films which have placed number one at the weekly box office in Australia during 1995. Amounts are in Australian dollars.

Highest-grossing films

References

See also
 List of Australian films - Australian films by year
 Lists of box office number-one films

1995
Australia
1995 in Australian cinema